Epideira candida is a species of sea snail, a marine gastropod mollusk in the family Horaiclavidae.

Description

Distribution
This marine species is endemic to Australia and occurs off New South Wales

References

 Laseron, C. F. (1954). Revision of the New South Wales Turridae. Royal Zoological Society of New South Wales Australian Zoological Handbook. Sydney: Royal Zoological Society of New South Wales. 56 pp., 12 pls.

candida
Gastropods described in 1954
Gastropods of Australia